Monument to Those Who Saved the World is a monument in Chernobyl, Ukraine, to the firefighters who died putting out the fire at the Chernobyl Nuclear Power Plant in 1986 after the catastrophic nuclear accident there. The monument is also dedicated to the Chernobyl liquidators who cleaned up after the accident.

References 

Chernobyl disaster
Monuments and memorials in Ukraine